List of communities in Inverness County, Nova Scotia

They are all unincorporated areas within the jurisdiction of the Municipality of the County of Inverness except the incorporated town of Port Hawkesbury.

Chéticamp
Grand Étang
Inverness
Judique
Mabou
Meat Cove
Orangedale
Pleasant Bay
Port Hastings
Port Hawkesbury
Port Hood
St. Joseph du Moine
Southwest Margaree
Whycocomagh

Former Communities
Cap-Rouge

See also

Inverness County
Geography of Inverness County, Nova Scotia